Besohana is a rural municipality in Madagascar. It belongs to the district of Mandoto, which is a part of Vakinankaratra Region. The population of the commune was 12,839  inhabitants in 2018.

Concerning education, only primary schooling is available. The majority, 64% of the population of the commune, are farmers, while an additional of 35.8% receives their livelihood from raising livestock. The most important crop is rice, while other important products are maize and cassava. Industry provides employment for 0.2% of the population.

The Provincial Road RIP 138 connects Betsohana with Ambatolahy.

References and notes 

Populated places in Vakinankaratra